Matthew Thomas Campbell (born July 14, 1972) is a former American football offensive lineman in the National Football League for the Carolina Panthers and the Washington Redskins.  He played college football at the University of South Carolina. He is the former Offensive Coordinator at Virginia Military Institute. In January 2015, he was named the head football coach and athletic director at Lugoff-Elgin HS in Lugoff, SC.

References

1972 births
Living people
People from North Augusta, South Carolina
American football offensive linemen
South Carolina Gamecocks football players
Carolina Panthers players
Washington Redskins players
VMI Keydets football coaches